Arbelodes shimonii is a moth in the family Cossidae. It is found in South Africa, where it has been recorded from the Cederberg. The habitat consists of submontane and montane woody riparian areas.

The length of the forewings is about 12 mm. The forewings are glossy smoke grey with deep olive-grey spots along the costal margin and a pure white terminal band. The hindwings are faded, glossy greyish olive with small white patches along the termen.

Etymology
The species is named for Shimoni Lehmann, the son of the author.

References

Natural History Museum Lepidoptera generic names catalog

Endemic moths of South Africa
Moths described in 2010
Metarbelinae